Dairi may refer to:
 The , the Japanese Imperial family's official residence in the capital. In Kyoto, this was the Heian Palace or later, the Kyoto Imperial Palace, the latter considered a "town palace". Each of the former capitals, Fujiwara-kyō, Heijō-kyō, Nagaoka-kyō had a dairi, though now in ruins.
 or by transference, indirect (now archaic) way of referring to the Emperor of Japan
 A language spoken in Indonesia and written in the Batak script
 Dairi Regency, one regency of North Sumatra province of Indonesia
 The dahu, a legendary animal
 Dahiri, Ivory Coast, a town that is sometimes spelled "Dairi"

See also
 Dairy (disambiguation)